Ağdərə, Azerbaijan (Azeri for "white creek") may refer to:
Ağdərə, Khizi, Azerbaijan
Ağdərə, Nakhchivan, Azerbaijan
Ağdərə, Tartar, Azerbaijan
Ağdərə, Tovuz, Azerbaijan
Mardakert, a province in the Nagorno-Karabakh Republic